Shkjipe Bojku (born 21 September 1997) is a Macedonian footballer who plays as a forward for the North Macedonia national team.

International career
Bojku made her debut for the North Macedonia national team on 27 October 2015, against Scotland.

References

1997 births
Living people
Women's association football forwards
Macedonian women's footballers
North Macedonia women's international footballers